This was the first edition of the tournament, primarily created due to the one-week delay of the 2021 French Open.

Sebastian Korda won his first ATP Tour singles title, defeating Marco Cecchinato in the final, 6–2, 6–4 without dropping a set. By winning the tournament, Korda became the first American male tennis player to win on European clay since Sam Querrey in 2010.

Seeds
The top four seeds receive a bye into the second round.

Draw

Finals

Top half

Bottom half

Qualifying

Seeds

Qualifiers

Lucky loser

Qualifying draw

First qualifier

Second qualifier

Third qualifier

Fourth qualifier

References

External links
Main draw
Qualifying draw

2021 ATP Tour
2021 Singles